Hustisford may refer to:

Places
United States
 Hustisford (town), Wisconsin, a town in Dodge County, Wisconsin
 Hustisford, Wisconsin, a village inside the town of Hustisford